Ahmadi (also Romanized as Aḩmadī) is a village in the Shaab Jereh Rural District of the Toghrol Al Jerd District in the Kuhbanan County of Kerman Province, Iran. According to the 2006 census, its population consisted of 9 families, with a total of 28 people.

References 

Populated places in Kuhbanan County